Kópavogur is a town in Iceland that is the country's second largest municipality by population.

It lies immediately south of Reykjavík and is part of the Capital Region. The name literally means seal pup inlet. The town seal contains the profile of the church Kópavogskirkja with a seal pup underneath.

Kópavogur is largely made up of residential areas, but has commercial areas and much industrial activity as well. The tallest building in Iceland, the Smáratorg Tower, is located in central Kópavogur.

{
  "type": "ExternalData",
  "service": "geoshape",
  "ids": "Q163852"
}

History
Kópavogur is historically significant as the site of the 1662 Kópavogur meeting. This event marked the total incorporation of Iceland into Denmark–Norway when, on behalf of the Icelandic people, Bishop Brynjólfur Sveinsson and Árni Oddsson, a lawyer, signed a document confirming that the introduction of absolute monarchy by Frederick III of Denmark–Norway also applied to Iceland.

Kópavogur is also one of Iceland's most prominent sites for Icelandic urban legends about the huldufólk; it also features in this capacity in the 2010 film Sumarlandið, where the stone Grásteinn is portrayed as an elf-house in the Kópavogur municipality.

An independent township, Kópavogur is adjacent to Reykjavík.

Sports
Kópavogur's main sports clubs are Gerpla, Breiðablik and HK. In 2010 Breiðablik clinched their first Icelandic league title in football and in 2012 HK won their first Icelandic league title in team handball. 

The town is also home to the hardcore strongman and powerlifting training facility 'Thor's Power Gym' owned by the strongest man of all-time Hafþór Júlíus Björnsson, which was also the venue for the iconic 501 kg (1,105 lb) World Record Deadlift on 2 May 2020.

Notable people
Hafþór Júlíus Björnsson (born 1988), professional strongman
Sverrir Ingi Ingason (born 1993), footballer
Eiður Guðjohnsen (born 1978), footballer
Emilíana Torrini (born 1977), singer
Diljá (born 2002), singer

Twin towns – sister cities

Kópavogur is twinned with:

 Ammassalik, Greenland
 Tasiilaq, Greenland
 Klaksvík, Faroe Islands
 Mariehamn, Åland Islands, Finland
 Norrköping, Sweden
 Odense, Denmark
 Tampere, Finland
 Trondheim, Norway
 Wuhan, China

Gallery

See also
List of cities and towns in Iceland

References

External links

Official website 

 
Municipalities of Iceland
Populated places in Capital Region (Iceland)
Southwest Iceland